Scott Whiting (born 10 February 1978) is an Australian former rugby league professional footballer who played for the North Queensland Cowboys in the National Rugby League. A , he primarily played off the interchange.

Background
A Centrals Tigers junior, Whiting attended Townsville State High School before being signed by the North Queensland Cowboys as an 18-year old.

Playing career
In Round 23 of the 1998 NRL season, Whiting made his NRL debut in the Cowboys' 12–28 loss to the Manly Warringah Sea Eagles at Brookvale Oval. This would be Whiting's last NRL game for four years, playing predominantly for the Cowboys' feeder clubs, the Townsville Stingers and North Queensland Young Guns. In 2000, Whiting spent the season playing for the Wests Panthers before rejoining to the Cowboys in 2001.

In 2002, Whiting returned to first grade, playing 13 games. He played two more games in 2003 before being released by the Cowboys.

Statistics

NRL
 Statistics are correct to the end of the 2003 season

Post-playing career
Following his rugby league career, Whiting became a general and bariatric surgeon, graduating from the University of Notre Dame in Western Australia.

References

1978 births
Living people
Australian rugby league players
North Queensland Cowboys players
Rugby league centres
Rugby league locks
Rugby league players from Townsville
Wests Panthers players